Kenny Tari (born 2 April 1990) is a Vanuatuan cricketer. He played in the 2013 ICC World Cricket League Division Six tournament.

References

External links
 

1990 births
Living people
Vanuatuan cricketers
Place of birth missing (living people)